Below is a list of identifiable cuisines which together form the Cuisine of the United States.

Regional
 Cuisine of the Northeastern United States
 Cuisine of New England
 Cuisine of New Jersey
 Cuisine of Boston
 Cuisine of Philadelphia
 Cuisine of New York City
 Cuisine of the Midwestern United States
 Cuisine of Chicago
 Cuisine of Ohio
 Cuisine of Wisconsin
 Cuisine of Cincinnati
 Cuisine of St. Louis
 Cuisine of Omaha
 Cuisine of the Southern United States
 Cuisine of Kentucky
 Cuisine of New Orleans
 Cuisine of Houston
 Cuisine of Atlanta
 Floribbean
 Lowcountry cuisine
 Cajun cuisine
 Louisiana Creole cuisine
 Soul food
 Tex-Mex
 Cuisine of the Western United States
 Cuisine of California and the distinct California cuisine
 Pacific Northwest cuisine
 Rocky Mountain cuisine
 Cuisine of the Southwestern United States
 New Mexican cuisine
 Cuisine of Hawaii
 Puerto Rican cuisine

History
 Chuckwagon
 Culinary Revolution
 Cuisine of the Thirteen Colonies

Ethnic and religious
 American Chinese cuisine
 Soul food
 Euro-Asian cuisine
 Halal
 Italian-American cuisine
 Jewish cuisine
 Native American cuisine
 Cuisine of the Pennsylvania Dutch
 Greek-American cuisine
 Mexican-American cuisine
 Filipino-American cuisine

See also

 List of regional dishes of the United States
 Barbecue
 Fast food
 Fusion cuisines
 New American cuisine
 Christmas dishes
 Western pattern diet

Regional